Bosnia and Herzegovina competed at the 2015 European Games, in Baku, Azerbaijan from 12 to 28 June 2015.

Competitors

Athletics

Bosnia and Herzegovina finished the competition at 6th position overall with total of 338 points.

Men
Track & road events

Field events

Women
Track & road events

Field events

Boxing

Canoe sprint

Men

Women

Cycling

Mountain biking

Road
Men

Women

Judo

Men

Women

Shooting

Swimming

Men

Women

Table tennis

References

Nations at the 2015 European Games
European Games
2015